Perpendicular recording (or perpendicular magnetic recording, PMR), also known as conventional magnetic recording (CMR), is a technology for data recording on magnetic media, particularly hard disks.  It was first proven advantageous in 1976 by Shun-ichi Iwasaki, then professor of the Tohoku University in Japan, and first commercially implemented in 2005.  The first industry-standard demonstration showing unprecedented advantage of PMR over longitudinal magnetic recording (LMR) at nanoscale dimensions was made in 1998 at IBM Almaden Research Center in collaboration with researchers of Data Storage Systems Center (DSSC) – a National Science Foundation (NSF) Engineering Research Center (ERCs) at Carnegie Mellon University (CMU).

Advantages
Perpendicular recording can deliver more than three times the storage density of traditional longitudinal recording. In 1986, Maxell announced a floppy disk using perpendicular recording that could store . Perpendicular recording was later used by Toshiba in 3.5" floppy disks in 1989 to permit 2.88 MB of capacity (ED or extra-high density), but they failed to succeed in the marketplace. Since about 2005, the technology has come into use for hard disk drives. Hard disk technology with longitudinal recording has an estimated limit of  due to the superparamagnetic effect, though this estimate is constantly changing. In 2016 the commercially available density was at least . In late 2021 the Seagate disk with the highest density was a consumer targeted 2.5" BarraCuda. It used  density.

Technology

The main challenge in designing magnetic information storage media is to retain the magnetization of the medium despite thermal fluctuations caused by the superparamagnetic limit. If the thermal energy is too high, there may be enough energy to reverse the magnetization in a region of the medium, destroying the data stored there. The energy required to reverse the magnetization of a magnetic region is proportional to the size of the magnetic region and the magnetic coercivity of the material. The larger the magnetic region is and the higher the magnetic coercivity of the material, the more stable the medium is. Thus, there is a minimum size for a magnetic region at a given temperature and coercivity. If it is any smaller it is likely to be spontaneously de-magnetized by local thermal fluctuations. Perpendicular recording uses higher coercivity materials because the head's write field penetrates the medium more efficiently in the perpendicular geometry.

The popular explanation for the advantage of perpendicular recording is that it achieves higher storage densities by aligning the poles of the magnetic elements, which represent bits, perpendicularly to the surface of the disk platter, as shown in the illustration. In this not-quite-accurate explanation, aligning the bits in this manner takes less platter area than what would have been required had they been placed longitudinally. This means cells can be placed closer together on the platter, thus increasing the number of magnetic elements that can be stored in a given area. The true picture is a bit more complex, having to do with the use of a magnetically "stronger" (higher coercivity) material as the storage medium. This is possible because in a perpendicular arrangement the magnetic flux is guided through a magnetically soft (and relatively thick) underlayer underneath the hard magnetic media films (considerably complicating and thickening the total disk structure). This magnetically soft underlayer can be effectively considered a part of the write head, making the write head more efficient, thus making it possible to produce a stronger write field gradient with essentially the same head materials as for longitudinal heads, and therefore allowing for the use of the higher coercivity magnetic storage medium. A higher coercivity medium is inherently thermally more stable, as stability is proportional to the product of bit (or magnetic grain) volume times the uniaxial anisotropy constant Ku, which in turn is higher for a material with a higher magnetic coercivity.

In the early 2000s, three important factors came together which finally allowed perpendicular recording to exceed the capabilities of longitudinal recording and led to commercial success (below). First, the development of media with an oxide-segregant exchange-break between grains. Second, the use of a thin 'cap' on the media to control the level of exchange-coupling between grains and to enhance propagation of switching through the thickness of the medium. Third, the introduction of the trailing-shield head invented by Michael Mallary. This head offered higher field gradients and more favorable field angles than a simple pole head.

Implementations
Vertimag Systems Corporation, founded by Professor Jack Judy of the University of Minnesota. As a colleague of Iwasaki, created the first perpendicular disk drives, heads and disks in 1984. 5 MB removable floppy drives were demonstrated in IBM PCs to major computer manufacturers. Vertimag went out of business during the PC crash of 1985.

Toshiba produced the first commercially available disk drive (1.8") using this technology in 2005. Shortly thereafter in January 2006, Seagate Technology began shipping its first laptop sized  hard drive using perpendicular recording technology, the Seagate Momentus 5400.3. Seagate also announced at that time that the majority of its hard disk storage devices would utilize the new technology by the end of 2006.

In April 2006, Seagate began shipping the first 3.5 inch perpendicular recording hard drive, the Cheetah 15K.5, with up to 300GB storage, running at 15,000 rpm and claim to have 30% better performance than their predecessors with a data rate of 73–125 Mbyte/s.

In April 2006, Seagate announced the Barracuda 7200.10, a series of  HDDs utilizing perpendicular recording with a maximum capacity of 750 GB. Drives began shipping in late April 2006.

Hitachi announced a 20 GB Microdrive. Hitachi's first laptop drive (2.5-inch) based on perpendicular recording became available in mid-2006, featuring a maximum capacity of 160 GB.

In June 2006, Toshiba announced a  hard drive of 200-GB capacity with mass production starting in August, effectively raising the standard of mobile storage capacity.

In July 2006, Western Digital announced volume production of its WD Scorpio  hard drives using WD-designed and manufactured perpendicular magnetic recording (PMR) technology to achieve 80 GB-per-platter density.

In August 2006 Fujitsu extended its  lineup to include SATA models utilizing perpendicular recording, offering up to 160GB capacity.

In December 2006 Toshiba said its new 100GB two-platter HDD is based on perpendicular magnetic recording (PMR) and was designed in the "short" 1.8-inch form factor.

In December 2006 Fujitsu announced its MHX2300BT series of  hard disk drives, with capacities of 250 and 300 GB.

In January 2007 Hitachi announced the first 1-terabyte hard drive using the technology, which they then delivered in April 2007.

In July 2008 Seagate Technology announced a 1.5 terabyte SATA hard drive using PMR technology.

In January 2009 Western Digital announced the first 2.0 terabyte SATA hard drive using PMR technology.

In February 2009 Seagate Technology announced the first 7,200rpm 2.0 terabyte SATA hard drive using PMR technology with choice of SATA 2 or SAS 2.0 interface.

See also
Shingled magnetic recording (SMR)
Exchange spring media
Heat-assisted magnetic recording (HAMR)

References

 S.N. Piramanayagam, J. Appl. Phys. 102, 011301 (2007).

External links
 "Get Perpendicular" A Flash animation and song explaining perpendicular recording from Hitachi Research
 Perpendicular Magnetic Recording (Hardcover) by Sakhrat Khizroev, Dmitri Litvinov: 

Hard disk drives
Heat-assisted magnetic recording
Japanese inventions
Computer storage technologies